Liliana Cian (born 19 July 1959) is a Colombian former swimmer. She competed in three events at the 1976 Summer Olympics.

References

External links
 

1959 births
Living people
Colombian female swimmers
Olympic swimmers of Colombia
Swimmers at the 1976 Summer Olympics
Place of birth missing (living people)
20th-century Colombian women
21st-century Colombian women